The 2012 British Figure Skating Championships was held from 21 to 27 November 2011 in Sheffield. Medals were awarded in the disciplines of men's singles, ladies' singles, pair skating, and ice dancing on the senior, junior, and novice levels. The results were among the criteria to determine the British teams for the 2012 World Championships, 2012 European Championships, and 2012 World Junior Championships Championships.

Medalists

Senior

Junior

Novice

Senior results

Men

Ladies

Pairs

Ice dancing

References

External links
 2012 British Championships results
 National Ice Skating Association

British Figure Skating Championships
2011 in figure skating
British Figure Skating Championships, 2012
Figure Skating Championships
Figure Skating Championships